Ondame is a village in the Biombo Region of Guinea-Bissau.

Location
It lies on the coast, west of Bissau where the Mansoa River flows into the sea.

References

External links
Maplandia World Gazetteer

Populated places in Guinea-Bissau
Biombo Region